Boatswain's Mate William S. Bond (1839 to March 17, 1892) was an American soldier who fought in the American Civil War. Bond received the country's highest award for bravery during combat, the Medal of Honor, for his action aboard the  near Cherbourg-Octeville, France on June 19, 1864. He was honored with the award on 31 December 1864.

Biography

Bond was born in 1839 in Boston, Massachusetts, and enlisted into United States Navy aboard the Union warship  on 16 January 1862.

On 19 June 1864 Bond was aboard the Kearsarge, under command of captain John Ancrum Winslow in its hunt for the CSS Alabama. The Alabama was discovered anchored for repairs at the Cherbourg Harbor, France. Both ships headed for battle outside of French waters and what became known as the Battle of Cherbourg ensued. The Alabama was sunk within hours. Bond, along with sixteen other members of the Kearsarge crew, was awarded with the Medal of Honor for their gallantry during this battle.

Bond died on 17 March 1892 in Vallejo, California, and his remains are interred at the Sunrise Memorial Cemetery.

Medal of Honor citation

See also

List of American Civil War Medal of Honor recipients: A–F

References

1839 births
1892 deaths
People of Massachusetts in the American Civil War
Union Navy officers
United States Navy Medal of Honor recipients
American Civil War recipients of the Medal of Honor